Ali Mohsen Hudal Al Tamimi (born 1975 in Baghdad) is an Iraqi politician and former governor of Baghdad.

Al Tamimi was a member of the "House of Representatives" of the Sadrist Movement and elected in 2013 to the post of governor of Baghdad. On 19 January 2016 the Baghdad Provincial Council voted to remove him from office because of corruption charges. On 6 March 2016, Atwan Al Atwani of the State of Law Coalition was elected the new governor of Baghdad.

References

Governors of Baghdad Governorate
Iraqi politicians
Iraqi soldiers
Living people
1975 births
People from Baghdad
Iraqi Shia Muslims